The Hungarian Defence Forces General Staff Scientific Research Centre is a part of the Hungarian Defence Forces (HDF) and works directly under the General Staff.

Strategy
The centre supports the scientific and professional foundation of the HDF and its underlying military organizations, the commander decision-making, the scientific education and continuative education through the operation of their system. It provides appropriate scientific forecast on the area of operation and building of the armies and research and development.

Main Areas
Organization of scientific jobs, completion of researches, and support the innovation of research results, scientific education and continuative education, scientific information supply, scientific cooperation, organization of scientific events, care for professional and scientific publications.

References

External links
 Twitter (HDF GS Scientific Research Center)
 Facebook (Honvéd Vezérkar Tudományos Kutatóhely)

Research institutes in Hungary